Celestino de Palma (born 21 December 1912, date of death unknown) was a Brazilian rower. He competed in the men's single sculls event at the 1936 Summer Olympics.

References

1912 births
Year of death missing
Brazilian male rowers
Olympic rowers of Brazil
Rowers at the 1936 Summer Olympics
Sportspeople from São Paulo